1996: Pust på meg!, also known as simply Pust på meg, is a 1997 Norwegian drama film directed by Eva Dahr, Oddvar Einarson, Mona J. Hoel, Marius Holst and Eva Isaksen, and starring Krister Henriksson, Frits Helmuth, Stina Ekblad, Erik Hivju and Bjørn Sundquist. Four different scenes are being played out in an apartment in Oslo one day in April 1996.

External links
 
 Pust på meg at Filmweb.no

1997 films
1997 drama films
Films directed by Marius Holst
Norwegian drama films